The Memorial to the Liberation of Algeria is a brutalist monument on Boulevard Mohamed-Khemisti in Algiers. It was designed in 1978 by Algerian visual artist M'hamed Issiakhem, as Algiers was preparing to host the 1978 All-Africa Games. The memorial incorporates an earlier sculpted group from the French colonial era, formerly known as the monument aux morts or Le Pavois (referring to a shield used to carry somebody on high), no longer visible but still extant beneath a concrete casing.

History

It featured a winged Victory evoking Marianne between a French poilu and an Algerian spahi, all three on horseback and together holding a shield on which rests the body of a fallen World War I combatant. Additional figures included two women and two old men on the monument's back, intended to symbolize the emotional ties between the diverse communities of French Algeria.

Issiakhem's design was a conscious endeavor to preserve the French colonial monument, which also honored the suffering of Algerian fighters, while removing it from public view.

See also
 Martyrs' Memorial, Algiers
 Monuments aux Morts

Notes

National monuments in Algeria
Buildings and structures in Algiers
Buildings and structures completed in 1978
Algerian War
Brutalist architecture in Africa
20th-century architecture in Algeria